W. H. Logan was a farmer, preacher, teacher and politician in the Arkansas Delta. He served in the Arkansas Senate from 1887 to 1891. He was born in Ohio in the first half of the 1850s. During his career he served as a justice of the peace, preacher, teacher, and farmer.

Bell was elected to the Arkansas Senate and served representing the 15th District (Desha and Chicot County, Arkansas Chicot counties) in the 26th Arkansas General Assembly and the 27th Arkansas General Assembly. He was a Republican.

See also
African-American officeholders during and following the Reconstruction era

References

1850s births
People from Ohio
Republican Party Arkansas state senators
19th-century American politicians
19th-century African-American people